Earnest Lee Stewart Jr. (born March 28, 1969) is an Dutch-American former soccer player who played as a striker or a midfielder. His career spanned 17 years from 1988 until his retirement in 2005, with the majority of the years spent in the Netherlands, the country of his birth. Stewart also represented the United States in international soccer. 

Since his retirement from professional soccer, Stewart has served as a soccer executive in various positions for multiple organizations. He is currently the director of football for PSV Eindhoven.

Early life and education
Earnie Stewart is the son of African American U.S. Air Force airman Earnie Stewart Sr. and his wife Annemien, Stewart grew up in Uden, the Netherlands.

Playing career
Stewart began his professional career in the Netherlands in 1988 with VVV-Venlo. By the end of 1990, he made his first appearance for the United States national team against Portugal.

In his first season at Willem II, he finished third on the goal-scoring list for the Dutch First Division with 17. He went on to score 49 goals in six seasons there. In the meantime, he became a regular for the United States national team, starting all four games that the United States played in the 1994 FIFA World Cup. Most notably, he scored the goal that gave the United States its winning margin against Colombia in the group stage, the first World Cup game won by the United States since 1950.

By 1996, Stewart had moved to NAC Breda, eventually spending more than six seasons there. NAC was relegated in 1999, but Stewart helped the club win the First Division in 2000, thereby earning promotion back to the Eredivisie. During his years at NAC, he also played in all of the United States team's matches at the 1998 and 2002 FIFA World Cups, becoming one of only five American men to play at three World Cups.

In January 2003, he left the Netherlands to play in Major League Soccer, and was allocated to D.C. United, where he won the MLS Cup in his second season. His scoring numbers did not equal his earlier high standards, as he tallied just four regular season goals and one playoff goal in MLS. He left D.C. after the 2004 season, coming back to the Netherlands and his original club, VVV-Venlo, where he became technical director following his retirement in 2005.

Stewart became the eighth American man to make his 100th international appearance in a 2004 World Cup qualifier against Grenada. His 111 goals as a professional in the Netherlands makes him the highest-scoring American in international club play. He was named U.S. Soccer Athlete of the Year in 2001.

Post-playing career
On May 14th, 2006, Earnie Stewart was named technical director of NAC Breda.

He was appointed as AZ Alkmaar's director of football affairs in June 2010. The 41-year-old succeeded Marcel Brands, who left AZ for PSV. Stewart left his post as technical director at NAC Breda by mutual consent. 

One of Stewart's long-term goal was to returning to United States as an soccer executive: "One ambition I do have is to go back to the United States and to be of importance to soccer."

Stewart accomplished that goal on October 26, 2015 when the Philadelphia Union officially announced that Stewart would take on the role of sporting director for the club.

On June 6, 2018, Stewart was named general manager of the United States men's national team.

On August 12, 2019, Stewart was promoted to the position of sporting director of the United States Soccer Federation. 

On January 26, 2023, the U.S. Soccer Federation announced that Stewart would be departing and would be joining PSV as the new technical director for the club. Stewart remained with U.S. Soccer until February 15, 2023 to assist with a peaceful transition to the next sporting director.

Career statistics

Club

International

Scores and results list the United States' goal tally first, score column indicates score after each Stewart goal.

See also
List of United States men's international soccer players born outside the USA
List of men's footballers with 100 or more international caps

References

External links
 Stewart to Join NAC Breda
 Moneyball comes to AZ Alkmaar

1969 births
Living people
People from Veghel
People from Uden
Citizens of the United States through descent
United States men's international soccer players
American soccer players
D.C. United players
NAC Breda players
VVV-Venlo players
Willem II (football club) players
Major League Soccer players
1994 FIFA World Cup players
1995 Copa América players
1998 FIFA World Cup players
1999 FIFA Confederations Cup players
2002 FIFA World Cup players
2003 FIFA Confederations Cup players
2003 CONCACAF Gold Cup players
Dutch emigrants to the United States
African-American soccer players
FIFA Century Club
Eredivisie players
Eerste Divisie players
Dutch people of American descent
Sportspeople of American descent
Directors of football clubs in the Netherlands
Association football forwards
Association football midfielders
National Soccer Hall of Fame members
21st-century African-American people
20th-century African-American sportspeople
Footballers from North Brabant
Dutch footballers